The benefactive case (abbreviated , or sometimes  when it is a core argument) is a grammatical case used where English would use "for", "for the benefit of", or "intended for", e.g. "She opened the door for Tom" or "This book is for Bob". The benefactive case expresses that the referent of the noun it marks receives the benefit of the situation expressed by the clause.

This meaning is often incorporated in a dative case. In Latin this type of dative is called the dativus commodi.

An example of a language with a benefactive case is Basque, which has a benefactive case ending in -entzat. Quechua is another example, and the benefactive case ending in Quechua is -paq. Tangkhul-Naga (from the Tibeto-Burman group of languages) has the benefactive case marker .

In Aymara, the benefactive case is marked with -taki, expressing that the referent of the inflected noun benefits from the situation expressed by the verb, or, when there is no verb, that the noun to which it attaches is a recipient, as in the word below:

Benefactive meaning may also be marked on the verb, in a common type of applicative voice.

Autobenefactive 
An autobenefactive case or voice marks a case where the agents and the benefactor are one and the same. In Rhinelandic colloquial German, one finds expressions like:
 
(I smoke a cigarette for myself), where  (for myself) is optional.

In the Colognian language, there is a compulsory autobenefactive for example with the verb  (to pray) when it is used intransitively:
 
(He is praying).

Similarly, in French one can say, in informal but fully correct language:
  
(Literally: I (to) myself smoke a cigarette. I (to) myself do a pause.)

Formally, those forms coincide with reflexives in these languages.

A similar construction is also found in colloquial English with a pronoun that is reflexive in function but not form:
 ''

See also
 Ditransitive verb

References

Grammatical cases
Transitivity and valency